Peepshow is the ninth studio album by English rock band Siouxsie and the Banshees, released in September 1988 on Polydor. It was their first record as a quintet. With the arrival of multi-instrumentalist Martin McCarrick and guitarist Jon Klein, the group recorded a multifaceted album with a variety of influences. It included the singles "Peek-a-Boo", "the Killing Jar" and "The Last Beat of My Heart". The record was a commercial success, peaking at No. 20 in the UK, and No. 68 on the US Billboard 200 chart in the week of 3 December 1988. It spent a total of 20 weeks on that chart. "Peek-a-Boo" reached number one on the Billboard Alternative Songs chart and "the Killing Jar" got the number two spot.

Praise centred around the unpredictability of the orchestrations and new nuances in Siouxsie's voice. The album was later remastered and reissued on CD with bonus tracks in October 2014.  A 180g vinyl reissue, remastered from the original ¼” tapes and cut half-speed at Abbey Road Studios by Miles Showell, was released in December 2018.

It is the subject of the 2018 book Peepshow by Samantha Bennett, part of the 33 1/3 series.

Music
Music journalist Parke Puterbaugh described "Peek-a-Boo" as a "collage of sound that incorporates a backward percussion track" with the voice bouncing from channel to channel. "The Killing Jar" opens with "a faint splash of reggae" and then the music dissolves into a trancelike drone in the style of Brian Eno. "Scarecrow" has a "Middle-Eastern feel" and the first side rushes to a climax in "Burn-Up", with cello and drums "simulating a train's mounting momentum".

Critical reception

Q wrote in its 5 out of 5 star review: "Peepshow takes place in some distorted fairground of the mind where weird and wonderful shapes loom." Reviewer Mark Cooper hailed "Martin McCarrick's accordion that pokes its way into Peek A Boo [...] a carny piece of musical imagination". He noted that "the rest of the record bursts with similar acts of imagination", saying: "full honours go to the aforementioned McCarrick for all manner of shrewd decorations and drummer Budgie for endlessly inventive rhythm work that manages to pinpoint the tension inherent in each song without ever lapsing into an obvious beat". Melody Maker highly praised its first single, "Peek-a-Boo", and called it "quite the most astounding British record" of 1988, and "a brightly unexpected mixture of black steel and pop disturbance." The paper also praised the band for the ballad "The Last Beat of My Heart". Chris Roberts said: "The infinite pinnacle is their one joint effort, the bravura hymn "The Last Beat of My Heart"". As Martin McCarrick's accordion and Budgie's directly intelligent rhythms underlie its pathos, this elegy is translated by Sioux with capital beatitude. It's the Banshees' most courageous arabesque in some time." Record Mirror also particularly enjoyed that song when reviewing the album: "The highlight is the restrained 'The Last Beat of My Heart', where Siouxsie's voice explores new ground as she caresses a haunting melody." Reviewer Kevin Murphy concluded by saying: "Brimming with confidence [...], Peepshow is the Banshees' finest hour." NME noted a change of approach in the musical direction: "Peepshow is the best Banshees record since A Kiss in the Dreamhouse because it's the Banshees deciding to be a pop band rather than a rock group".

Spin published a glowing review of the album in their November issue. Discussing "Peek-a-Boo", critic Tony Fletcher said that it's "mood fell in perfectly with their beloved London's summer fascination with the sparsity and confusion that call Acid House, Psychedelic and how!" He described the music of "Peek-a-Boo" as "a crazed assortment of fairground accordions, abrupt horns, distant to-and-fro vocals-exotic, erotic, a dancefloor winner for sure and all of three minutes short." Fletcher also hailed the other tracks, noting "an almost lilting reggae feel to the beginning of "Killing Jar", a fragile, waif-like Siouxsie backed only by translucent guitar and a keyboard bass on the brief "Rawhead and Bloodybones", and a delightful, majestic ballad the likes of which it had been a safe assumption was beyond their reach on "The Last Beat of My Heart". [...] As Peepshow ends with the drawn-out "Rhapsody", Siouxsie's operatic flings seem to be a celebration of her reawakened capacity to thrill." Fletcher concluded: "She and the band sound as confident, abandoned and excited as when they started". In Stereo Review, the album was published in the column "Best of the Month". Reviewer Parke Puterbaugh wrote that the record was "a fascinating plunge into the subconscious" and was "Dream-like" and "hypnotic", further emphasizing, "Peepshow brims with nonlinear logic, compulsive rhythms, and icy, crystalline textures." The critic concluded his review, qualifying it as an "utterly unconventional and thoroughly intoxicating album" [...] "a transcendent feat: They are not playing music, the music is playing them".

Writing in the 2004 edition of The Rolling Stone Album Guide, Mark Coleman and Mac Randall gave Peepshow a rating of 2.5 stars out of five, saying that the album mixes "synthesizers and a lighter pop touch with the Banshees' trademark howl", but the combination "lacks spark". A 2014 retrospective review in The Telegraph praised the end result, saying that "lush, folk-rock orchestration produced perfect pop".

Legacy
Bloc Party later praised "Peek-a-Boo", which their singer Kele Okereke described: "It sounded like nothing else on this planet. This is just a pop song [...], but to me it sounded like the most current but most futuristic bit of guitar-pop music I've heard." DeVotchKa later covered "The Last Beat of My Heart" at the suggestion of Arcade Fire singer Win Butler. The Decemberists also listed "The Last Beat of My Heart" as one of their favorite Siouxsie and the Banshees' songs. Peepshow was also one of the albums Nic Offer of the band !!! ("Chk Chk Chk"), listened to the most during his formative years. Emel Mathlouthi recorded a rendition of "Rhapsody" as a one-off for French Television, saying that the lyrics were close to her.

Track listing

Personnel
Siouxsie and the Banshees
Siouxsie Sioux – vocals 
Steven Severin – electric bass
Budgie – drums, percussion and harmonica
Martin McCarrick – cello, keyboards, accordion
Jon Klein – guitar

Additional personnel
Mike Hedges – producer, engineer

Charts

Certifications

References

Bibliography
 

Siouxsie and the Banshees albums
1988 albums
Albums produced by Mike Hedges
Polydor Records albums
Geffen Records albums